Pornography is the representation of the human body form or human sexual behavior with the goal of sexual arousal.

Pornography may also be:

Books
 Pornografia, a 1960 novel by Witold Gombrowicz
 Pornography: Men Possessing Women, a 1981 book by Andrea Dworkin
 Pornography, a play by Simon Stephens about the 7/7 train bombings

Film and television
 Pornography (film), a 2003 adaptation of Gombrowicz's novel
 Pornographic film
 "Pornography", an episode of the British sitcom Men Behaving Badly

Music
 Pornography (band), an American punk band
 Pornography (album), by the Cure, 1982, or the title song
 "Pornography" (song), a 2004 song by Client
 "Pornography", a song by Travis Scott from Rodeo

See also 
 Pornography in the United States
 Pawnography
 Porn (disambiguation)